Muscodor vitigenus is an endophytic fungus which colonizes Paullinia paullinioides, a liana of the Peruvian Amazon rainforests. It has the unusual property of, under certain circumstances, producing near-pure naphthalene, an insect repellent.

See also

Muscodor albus

References

Xylariales